No Fear was a professional wrestling tag team that consisted of Takao Omori and Yoshihiro Takayama. During their history, the team competed in All Japan Pro Wrestling and Pro Wrestling Noah.

History

All Japan Pro Wrestling (1998–2000)
No Fear formed in All Japan Pro Wrestling in the fall of 1998 as a subset of the "Triangle of Power" stable led by Gary Albright. The first highlight for the team was participating in the 1998 World's Strongest Tag Determination League but they ended up finishing in last place with 2 points by only beating Albright and Giant Kimala. A few months later they teamed with Hiroshi Hase in a one night six-man tag team tournament where they made it to the semi-finals before losing to Mitsuharu Misawa, Yoshinari Ogawa, and Masahito Kakihara. After Albright left them, Omori and Takayama began slowly moving up the ranks over the next few months. No Fear won their first title on June 4, 1999 when they defeated Hayabusa and Jinsei Shinzaki to win the All Asia Tag Team Championship. One month later, on July 23rd, No Fear defeated Johnny Ace and Bart Gunn to win the World Tag Team Championship thus giving the team a monopoly on the All Japan tag team division. On August 25th, No Fear lost both tag titles to Triple Crown Heavyweight Champion Mitsuharu Misawa and World Junior Heavyweight Championship Yoshinari Ogawa.

Three months later, on October 30th, No Fear challenged Kenta Kobashi and Jun Akiyama for the World Tag Team Championship but lost. After that, they entered the 1999 World's Strongest Tag Determination League where they finished in 6th place with 4 points, by beating the team of Vader and Johnny Smith and the team of Gary Albright and Wolf Hawkfield. On June 9, 2000, No Fear entered a tournament for the vacant World Tag Team Championship. They defeated Misawa and Ogawa in the semi-finals but lost to The Holy Demon Army in the finals. Shortly afterwards, Misawa left All Japan to form Pro Wrestling Noah with No Fear (along with the majority of the native roster) following Misawa to Noah.

Pro Wrestling Noah (2000–2002) 
No Fear debuted at Noah's first show on August 5, 2000 as they teamed with Satoru Asako in a six-man tag losing to Yoshinari Ogawa, Masahito Kakihara, & Daisuke Ikeda. No Fear would also take part in the debut show for Pro Wrestling Zero1 on March 2, 2001, defeating Tatsuhito Takaiwa and Alexander Otsuka. In 2001, Noah eventually started a tag team division and on December 9th, No Fear defeated Mitsuharu Misawa and Yoshinari Ogawa to win the GHC Tag Team Championship. The team would hold the titles for 2 months before losing them to Takeshi Morishima and Takeshi Rikio on February 17, 2002. No Fear eventually broke up in 2002 with their last match ending in a no contest against Jun Akiyama and Yoshinobu Kanemaru on May 9th  after Omori brutally hit Takayama with an Axe Bomber, betraying him.

Reunions (2011, 2013, 2016)
No Fear reunited the first time in nine years on August 27, 2011 at the New Japan, All Japan, Noah co-promoted show All Together losing to Jun Akiyama and Kensuke Sasaki. They reunited a second time on May 11, 2013 at Kenta Kobashi's retirement show Final Burning in Budokan where they defeated Minoru Suzuki and Naomichi Marufuji. On August 21, 2016, No Fear teamed for the final time at an All Japan/Land's End show defeating Suwama and Rikiya Fudo. 

On May 4, 2017, Takayama suffered a career ending spinal cord injury during a match which left him paralyzed from the shoulders down, leaving Omori as the only former No Fear member still in active competition.

Championships and accomplishments
 All Japan Pro Wrestling
All Asia Tag Team Championship (1 time)
World Tag Team Championship (1 time)
 Pro Wrestling Noah
GHC Tag Team Championship (1 time)

References

External links
 Takao Omori at purolove.com
 Yoshihiro Takayama at purolove.com
 Yoshihiro Takayama at cagematch.net
 Takao Omori at cagematch.net
 No Fear at cagematch.net

All Japan Pro Wrestling teams and stables
Pro Wrestling Noah teams and stables